"If You're Lookin' for a Way Out" is a 1980 song by group Odyssey from their album Hang Together. It was the second consecutive UK top 10 single in a row for the band, both gaining a silver certification in the UK. It featured Lillian Lopez on lead vocals and spent a total of fifteen weeks on the chart.

Track listings

7" single 

A "If You're Looking for a Way Out" - 3:15
B "Never Had It All" - 3:37

12" single 

A "If You're Looking for a way Out" - 4:29
B "Never Had It All" - 4:23

Charts

External links
 Odyssey (2) - If You're Looking For A Way Out on Discogs
 Odyssey - If You're Lookin' for a Way Out on All Music
 Odyssey - If You're Lookin' For A Way Out on Official Charts

1980 songs
1980 singles
Odyssey (band) songs